Argyrotaenia paiuteana is a species of moth of the family Tortricidae. It is found in the United States, where it has been recorded from California.

The wingspan is about 15–19 mm. Adults have been recorded on wing from May to August.

The larvae feed on Pinus monophylla and Juniperus occidentalis.

References

P
Endemic fauna of California
Fauna of the Mojave Desert
Moths of North America
Moths described in 1960